Acronicta lobeliae, the lobelia dagger moth or greater oak dagger moth, is a moth of the family Noctuidae. The species was first described by Achille Guenée in 1852. It is found in North America.

The larvae feed on Quercus species.

References

Acronicta
Moths of North America
Moths described in 1852